Blind Man's Bluff: The Untold Story of American Submarine Espionage by Sherry Sontag, Christopher Drew, and Annette Lawrence Drew, published in 1998 by PublicAffairs, is a non-fiction book about U.S. Navy submarine operations during the Cold War.

The book also contains an extensive list of collisions between Western and Soviet submarines and U.S. submarine awards.

References

Further reading
 

1998 non-fiction books
Books of naval history
Non-fiction books about espionage
Books about the United States Navy
Non-fiction books about submarine warfare
PublicAffairs books